Mica Lake is located in Grand Teton National Park, in the U. S. state of Wyoming. Mica Lake is a glacial lake which has a turquoise coloring due to silt from the now vanished Petersen Glacier.

References

Lakes of Grand Teton National Park